The Rosette skate (Leucoraja garmani) is an abundant mid-depth skate.

Etymology

The skate is named in honor of American ichthyologist-herpetologist Samuel Garman (1843‒1927), of Harvard University.

Distribution and habitat
At the extremes on the United States Atlantic Coast specimens have been found as far north as the Nantucket Shoals and as far south as the Dry Tortugas. Beyond, it has been located throughout the Caribbean, the eastern shores of Mexico and Central American, and the northern shores of South America.

Relationship to humans
Based on reported bycatch rates and population observances, there is no evidence to support concern of the Rosette Skate.

References

Rosette skate
Fish of the Eastern United States
Taxa named by Gilbert Percy Whitley
Rosette skate